Janusz Malik (born 30 September 1964) is a Polish former ski jumper. He competed at the 1984 Winter Olympics.

References

External links

1964 births
Living people
Polish male ski jumpers
Sportspeople from Bielsko-Biała
Olympic ski jumpers of Poland
Ski jumpers at the 1984 Winter Olympics
20th-century Polish people